Go for the Gold is a sculpture by Jonathan Bronson.

Description
Two copies are installed in Salt Lake City, Utah, United States. One sculpture is installed on the University of Utah campus and the other is displayed at The Gateway's Olympic Legacy Plaza. Donated by Robert L. Rice and Kenneth O. Melby, the sculptures depicts a skier.

See also

 List of public art in Salt Lake City

References

Outdoor sculptures in Salt Lake City
Sculptures of sports
Statues in Utah
University of Utah